Austria competed at the 2022 World Games held in Birmingham, United States from 7 to 17 July 2022. Athletes representing Austria won two gold medals, one silver medal and one bronze medal. The country finished in 30th place in the medal table.

Medalists

Competitors
The following is the list of number of competitors in the Games.

Archery

Austria competed in archery.

Barebow

Compound

Cue sports

Austria competed in cue sports.

Dancesport

Austria won one bronze medal in dancesport.

Duathlon

Austria competed in duathlon.

Fistball

Austria competed in fistball.

Flag football

Austria competed in flag football.

Ju-jitsu

Austria competed in ju-jitsu.

Karate

Austria won one silver medal in karate.

Women

Kickboxing

Austria won one gold medal in kickboxing.

Muaythai

Austria competed in muaythai.

Orienteering

Austria competed in orienteering.

Powerlifting

Austria competed in powerlifting.

Men

Women

Road speed skating

Austria competed in road speed skating.

Sport climbing

Austria won one gold medal in sport climbing.

Track speed skating

Austria competed in track speed skating.

Water skiing

Austria competed in water skiing.

References

Nations at the 2022 World Games
2022
World Games